Iaser Țurcan (born 7 January 1998) is a Moldovan footballer who plays as a midfielder for Petrocub Hîncești and the Moldova national team.

Career
Țurcan made his international debut for Moldova on 21 February 2019, starting in a friendly match against Kazakhstan before being substituted out for Valeriu Macrițchii in the 88th minute, with the match finishing as a 1–0 loss.

Career statistics

International

References

External links
 
 
 

1998 births
Living people
Moldovan footballers
Moldova youth international footballers
Moldova under-21 international footballers
Moldova international footballers
Association football midfielders
FC Dacia Chișinău players
FC Academia Chișinău players
FC Dinamo-Auto Tiraspol players
CS Petrocub Hîncești players
Moldovan Super Liga players
Liga II players
FC Universitatea Cluj players
Moldovan expatriate footballers
Moldovan expatriate sportspeople in Romania
Expatriate footballers in Romania